Dynasty was an association founded in 1999 by the Finnish bands The Rasmus, Killer and Kwan. Killer has since disbanded and are no longer considered members.

Philosophy
The reasons for founding the association was to strengthen the co-operation between the bands and subsequently their members. Members are anticipated to display the Dynasty logo, for example as part of tattoos or on guitar straps. Co-operation within the association transcends the main bands, and guest appearances are common. The Rasmus' drummer Aki Hakala has played in both Killer and Kwan, also appearing in Kwan's music video for the song Padam. Killer was co-produced and co-managed by Lauri Ylönen and Pauli Rantasalmi from The Rasmus. Rantasalmi has also produced the Kwan song Chillin' at the Grotto.

Since Killer disbanded in early 2005 the association has consisted of The Rasmus and Kwan. Later the same year Ylönen and Rantasalmi founded a recording studio in Helsinki, Finland. The record label was named Dynasty Recordings. The alternative rock bands Von Hertzen Brothers become part of the association and Happiness were signed to the label in 2006.

In 2008 the record label signed the singer Belle Who.

Dynasty Recordings

Dynasty Recordings was a small, independent record label for recruitment of new Finnish artists. The owners are Rantasalmi, Ylönen, Antti Eriksson, and Antti Eräkangas from Kwan and Happiness. Rantasalmi and Ylönen are the main songwriters.

Artists included in Dynasty Recordings

Current artists
 The Rasmus (1999–present)

Former artists
 Killer (1999-2005)
 Kwan (1999–2009)
 Von Hertzen Brothers (2006–2008)
 Happiness (2006–2007)
 Belle Who (2008–2009)
 Iconcrash (2009–2010)

References

External links
 Instagram page

The Rasmus